Acroperus tupinamba is a species of crustaceans. Its name refers to the largest tribe of indigenous peoples inhabiting Brazil before European colonization. It was first found among decomposing leaves in Planaltina, Distrito Federal, Brazil. It is a small Acroperus, the length of the female at or below 0.6mm. Its body is egg-shaped, with its maximum height in its body's second quarter. Its dorsal margin is quite arched, with its posteroventral angle denticles being very small. It carries about 35 to 40 ventral setae, with its posterior setae being longer than in cogenerate species. Its head has a low keel, the distance between its eye and the margin of its keel being equal to its eye diameter, which measures 1.5–2 times more than the ocellus. The species' head, antennule and labrum is the same as for the genus. The postabdomen narrows distally, the length of which is about 3.2 its height. Setules near the base of its postabdominal claws are short. Its antenna comprises less than 1/5 of its body length. All of its apical setae are of the same thickness and length. A. tupinamba differs from the other known species of its genus: A. harpae and A. Angustatus, by its smaller size; long posterior setae of the valves; a shorter, wider postabdomen; short setules near the base of its postabdominal claw; and the characteristic morphology of its fourth exopodite's setae 5–6, which is similar to those of Nicsmirnovius.

Description
This description is based on parthenogenetic female specimens. Its body possesses a well-expressed dorsal keel, and is relatively high and oval. Its posterodorsal angle is rounded, while the posterior margin can be moderately concave. The posteroventral angles are provided with 1–3 small denticles with broad bases, which carry small setules between them. It shows a row of approximately 100 short setules along the posterior margin of the inside of its carapace. Its ventral margin can be irregularly convex, with about 35–40 ventral setae, 8 of which are long. The anterodorsal part of valves is oblique in some specimens. The apex of the keel is rounded, its dorsal margin without possessing setules.

Its postabdomen is moderately long and narrow, somewhat narrowing distally, its length being about 3.2 times its height. Its preanal angle is well defined, while its postanal angle is not so. The postanal margin of the postabdomen is provided with 8 to 9 groups of tiny denticles. It also counts with 12–14 lateral fascicles of long setules, which in distalmost fascicles the length of its setules exceed the width of the base of its postabdominal claw. A cluster of short setules is located near the base of the postabdominal claws. The latter is long, almost straight, longer than the anal portion of the postabdomen. The spine at the end of the pecten is short. The antennule is long and narrow, with a length equating to about 4 widths, including 3 transverse rows of short setules at its anterior face. It possesses eight terminal aesthetascs, one of which is 1.5 times longer and thicker than the rest, even longer than the antennula itself.

The antenna is less than a fifth of its entire body length; branches are long and slender, of equal length. Seta arising from the basal segment of the endopodite are slightly shorter than the middle segment. The entire group of apical setae are of the same thickness and approximate length. The species shows six pairs of thoracic limbs. Sizes for females of the first juvenile instar represent: a length of 0.31–0.36mm; height of 0.20–0.23mm; in females of second juvenile instar sizes represent: length 0.39–0.43mm; height 0.25–0.27mm. In the adult female, the length averages between 0.50–0.57mm; the height between 0.30–0.37mm.

Distribution
Acroperus tupinamba is widely distributed in Brazil, having been found at marginal vegetated zones of ponds and reservoirs, as well as in streams, among marginal macrophytes or decomposing tree leaves.

References

Further reading
dos Santos-Wisniewski, Maria José, et al. "O estado atual do conhecimento da diversidade dos Cladocera (Crustacea, Branchiopoda) nas águas doces do estado de Minas Gerais." Biota Neotropica 11.3 (2011): 287-301.
Coelho, Paula Nunes, Eugênio Bastos Bernardes de Oliveira, and Maria José dos Santos-Wisniewski. "COMUNIDADE ZOOPLANCTÔNICA EM UM PEQUENO CORPO D’ÁGUA ASSOCIADO A UM FRAGMENTO FLORESTAL E PASTAGEM NO MUNICÍPIO DE ALFENAS-MG." Periódico Eletrônico Fórum Ambiental da Alta Paulista 10.3 (2014).
Rocha, Odete, Maria José Santos-Wisniewski, and Takako Matsumura-Tundisi. "Checklist de Cladocera de água doce do Estado de São Paulo." Biota Neotropica 11.1 (2011): 1-21.

Cladocera
Crustaceans described in 2010